Nala is a village in Nala CD block in the Jamtara Sadar subdivision of the Jamtara district in the Indian state of Jharkhand.

Geography

Location

Overview
The map shows a large area, which is a plateau with low hills, except in the eastern portion where the Rajmahal hills intrude into this area and the Ramgarh hills are there. The south-western portion is just a rolling upland. The entire area is overwhelmingly rural with only small pockets of urbanisation.

Note: The full screen map is interesting. All places marked on the map are linked in the full screen map and one can easily move on to another page of his/her choice. Enlarge the full screen map to see what else is there – one gets railway connections, many more road connections and so on.

Area

Demographics
According to the 2011 Census of India, Nala had a total population of 2,202, of which 1,136 (52%) were males and 1,066 (48%) were females. Population in the age range 0–6 years was 346. The total number of literate persons in Nala was 1,856 (75.32% of the population over 6 years).

Civic administration

Police station
There is a police station at Nala.

CD block HQ
Headquarters of Nala CD block is at Nala village.

Education
Degree College, affiliated with Sido Kanhu Murmu University, was established in 1988 at Nala.

Kasturba Gandhi Balika Vidyalaya, Nala, is a Hindi-medium girls only institution established in 2007. It has facilities for teaching from class VI to class XII.

Government High School Nala is a Hindi-medium coeducational institution established in 1966. It has facilities for teaching from class IX to class XII.

Nala Inter College Gopalpur is a Hindi-medium coeducational institution established in 1984. It has facilities for teaching in classes XI and XII.

References

Villages in Jamtara district